Herrington Country Park is a country park and open public space in Sunderland, Tyne and Wear. Located adjacent to Penshaw Monument, the park was built on the site of a former colliery. The park has developed into a significant home for wildlife, hosting up to 100 species of birds. The park also includes a play area, sculptures, an amphitheatre, and a model boat sailing site at the lake.

The park has hosted several major events, including Lets Rock, the UKs largest retro festival brand in 2018 and 2019, and BBC Radio One's Big Weekend in 2005, with Gwen Stefani, Foo Fighters and the Black Eyed Peas, as well as the Olympic Torch Relay in 2012. It also acts as the venue for the local Kubix Festival since 2018.

Since 20 July 2019, the park has held a free weekly 5km parkrun on a Saturday morning starting at 9am.

References

See also
Mowbray Park
Barnes Park

Parks and open spaces in Tyne and Wear
Urban public parks
Tourist attractions in the City of Sunderland